The Northwestern Bell Telephone Company Regional Headquarters building in Omaha, Nebraska was built in 1957 as the headquarters of Northwestern Bell, the telephone company that served Nebraska, Iowa, South Dakota, Minnesota, and North Dakota.  The building was listed on the National Register of Historic Places in 2009 for its architectural significance as a modern corporate office building in Omaha, as well as Omaha's status as a regional center of communication and commerce at the time.

The twelve-story building was originally built in 1957 on the northeast corner of the block bounded by Dodge Street on the north, Douglas Street on the south, 19th Street on the east, and 20th Street on the west.  In 1964, an addition was built on the northwest corner of the block, also twelve stories high.  The southeast corner of the block was the original company headquarters and switching center, built in 1918.  The 1918 building has been altered by additional equipment installation and removal of the ornamental façade, so it is not listed on the National Register.  Finally, the southwest corner of the block was built in 1970, making it too new for listing.

The company was formed by the merger of the Nebraska Telephone Company, the Iowa Telephone Company, and the Northwestern Telephone Exchange.  They were effectively operated by one general office and its staff by 1909, but they were not officially merged until 1921.  The company grew during the 1920s, but then faced financial difficulties during the Great Depression in the 1930s.  During World War II, most telephone company resources were being applied toward military and government jobs, so by the end of the war, there were about 59,000 outstanding requests for residential and business service.  Northwestern Bell realized that after the war, the development of new jobs and new homes would result in a demand for more telephone service.  By 1953, the company had 1,750,000 telephones and was spending $50 million in construction costs.  This growth in service produced a sizable economic effect on the region's economy.  The company also recognized the importance of hiring and retaining skilled telephone employees in order to provide outstanding telephone service.

Other growth at Northwestern Bell during this time included work with the Strategic Air Command, with its headquarters south of Omaha at Offutt Air Force Base.  The Strategic Air Command spent millions of dollars on communication equipment, including the "red telephone" system that connected 200 SAC locations to the command post at Offutt.  The need for instant communication made SAC the Bell System's first customer for Touch-Tone dialing.  Residential customers also benefited from faster service via coaxial cable and crossbar switching equipment.  Since a large amount of equipment had been added to the original Douglas Street building, many of the telephone company's employees were working in leased office space.

Design of the building began in the mid-1950s, following newly developed standards within the Bell System for building design.  These standards were influenced by modern architecture, particularly with respect to building mass, site selection, and materials.  The 1955 administration building in New Haven, Connecticut, the 1958 regional headquarters in Des Moines, Iowa, and the 1960 administration building in Denver, Colorado followed similar trends in architectural design.  These buildings were built with simpler, solid planes instead of Art Deco setbacks, such as had been used in the Northwestern Bell Building in Minneapolis built in 1931.  The building was designed by Leo A. Daly, which is now one of the largest architectural, engineering, planning, and interior design firms in the United States.  In 1962, an addition was built due to enlarged departmental needs, as well as the need to house more equipment.

References

Commercial buildings on the National Register of Historic Places in Nebraska
Commercial buildings completed in 1957
Buildings and structures in Omaha, Nebraska
Telecommunications buildings on the National Register of Historic Places
National Register of Historic Places in Omaha, Nebraska
1957 establishments in Nebraska